Sue Shear (March 17, 1918 – November 15, 1998) was an American politician who served in the Missouri House of Representatives from 1973 to 1998.  She was educated at the University City High School and at Washington University in St. Louis.

She died of cancer on November 15, 1998, in Clayton, Missouri at age 80.

References

1918 births
1998 deaths
Jewish women politicians
Democratic Party members of the Missouri House of Representatives
20th-century American politicians
Women state legislators in Missouri
20th-century American women politicians
Washington University in St. Louis alumni